Yaqoob Juma Al-Mukhaini (born 1 May 1982) is an Omani retired international footballer who played as a striker. He spent his entire career with Al-Orouba SC in the Omani League.

International career
Yaqoob was part of the first team squad of the Oman national football team from 2000 to 2002. He was selected for the national team for the first time in 2002. He has made appearances in the 2002 FIFA World Cup qualification.

Career statistics

Club

References

External links

Yaqoob Juma Al-Mukhaini - GOALZZ.com
Yaqoob Juma Al-Mukhaini - KOOORA.com

1982 births
Living people
Omani footballers
Association football forwards
Al-Orouba SC players
Oman Professional League players
Oman international footballers